The Thorn Birds is a 2011 South Korean television series shown on KBS2, where one woman forsakes her love and family for her ambition while another woman embraces with love all that the former had left behind. Fates of a bit part actress Seo Jung-eun (played by Han Hye-jin) and a film producer Han Yoo-kyung (played by Kim Min-jung) who chose success are intertwined and resolved gradually as their mutual stories progress.

The "thorn birds" of the title refers to Jung-eun's character, who only brings out her best at the cost of great pain. A thornbird is a mythical bird who searches for a thorn tree from the day it is born. When it finds it, the bird impales itself upon the sharpest thorn, and rises above the agony to sing the most beautiful song ever heard.

Cast

Main characters
 Han Hye-jin as Seo Jung-eun
 Kim So-hyun as young Seo Jung-eun 
 Growing up she had to move from one welfare facility to another, after having been abandoned at birth. She had once been a promising actress but after plummeting to depths, she has since spent many years as a bit part actress. Embracing the baby and grandmother abandoned by her friend Yoo-kyung as her own family, she protects them, and in the process, heals her own wounds too. Meeting again her long-lost love Young-jo – with whom she had a precocious love at puberty but had to go their own ways due to a friend's jealousy - she resumes the love and leads him to success. Little did she know that he was the biological father of the child she has embraced as her own...
 Kim Min-jung as Han Yoo-kyung
 Yoon Jung-eun as young Han Yoo-kyung 
 A film director. She has been Jung-eun's old friend but the two shouldn't have met at all. Behind her intelligence and elegant smile lie coldness. After finding out Young-jo's family is a rich conglomerate owner, she seduces him and even becomes pregnant with his child. But after seeing him giving up on his inheritance and leaving his family, she doesn't waste a second turning away from him, even from their child. She goes after a man with great background (Kang-woo) only for success but she finds her friend Jung-eun – whom she considered as foolish – has become more successful than her.
 Joo Sang-wook as Lee Young-jo
 Lee Tae-ri as young Lee Young-jo
 A film producer. A tragic character and an illegitimate child of a conglomerate’s owner. Giving up on a great inheritance and losing Yoo-kyung, he starts his own modest business from the bottom, learning things each day. His first love Jung-eun whom he had loved protects him like a guardian angel. As they rediscover their love and it matures, great secrets are discovered one by one... As his former love Yoo-kyung re-appears, another conflict ensues.
 Seo Do-young as Choi Kang-woo
 A film director. Mesmerized by Jung-eun after meeting her at a movie shoot, he does his utmost for her with his heart fully concealed, but they break up after a silly argument. Meeting her again by chance few months later, he discovers that she has become a mother of a child, heaps scorn on her, and turns away. He can't help feeling sad by and sympathetic toward Jung-eun whom he keeps running into at job. He acts like a heartless brute in front of her but helps her secretly, and rejoices in seeing her becoming a star after long years as an unknown.

Supporting characters
 Cha Hwa-yeon as Yoon Myung-ja / Lee Ae-rin
 Kim Ha-eun as Yang Mi-ryun
 Song Ok-sook as Kim Kye-soon
 Choi Jae-won as Park Han-soo
 Kim Dong-young as young Han-soo
 Jung Ui-kap as Lee Young-gook
 Park Ji-il as Choi Jong-dal
 Ahn Seung-hoon as Yoon Myung-goo
 Lee Mi-young as Soon-geum
 Jung Eun-byul as Seo Jin
 Oh Hyun-kyung as Young-jo's grandfather
 Lee Won-jae as Yoon Hak-goo
 Choi Sang-hoon as Seo Jin's father
 Jung Kyung-soon as Yoo-kyung's adoptive mother
 Jang Minho as Lee Soo-young
 Jang Yong (cameo)
 Kim Ji-young

Notes

Ratings

Source: TNS Media Korea

References

External links
  
 
 

2011 South Korean television series debuts
2011 South Korean television series endings
Korean Broadcasting System television dramas
South Korean melodrama television series
South Korean romance television series